Gustav Haloun (12 January 1898, Brtnice, Moravia, Austria-Hungary — 24 December 1951, Cambridge, England) was a Czech sinologist. 
He studied in Vienna under Arthur von Rosthorn and in Leipzig under August Conrady from where he received his Dr. phil. in 1923.

He obtained habilitation at Charles University in Prague where he lectured in 1926-1927. Afterwards he taught at Halle University (1928-1931), and Göttingen University (1931-1938), before becoming Chair of Chinese Language and History at Cambridge University, succeeding Arthur Christopher Moule and preceding Edwin G. Pulleyblank in that position.

He researched about the Hundred Schools of Thought, Bactria, Da Yuezhi, and Guanzi texts (cf. Guan Zhong).

Haloun's papers are held at Cambridge University Library.

Further reading 
 Ceadel, Eric Bertrand, 'Published works of the late Professor Gustav Haloun', Asia Major 3:1 (1953); PDF
 Franke, Herbert: 'Gustav Haloun (1898–1951).' Zeitschrift der Deutschen Morgenländischen Gesellschaft. No. 102, 1952, pp. 1–9. (online in German).
 Honey, David B., Incense at the Altar: Pioneering Sinologists and the Development of Classical Chinese Philology, 2001, pp. 152–66.
 Simon, Walter. 'Obituary. Gustav Haloun.' The Journal of the Royal Asiatic Society of Great Britain and Ireland. No. 1/2 (Apr., 1952), pp. 93–95. Published by Cambridge University Press. Article Stable URL: https://www.jstor.org/stable/25222563

External links

References 

1898 births
1951 deaths
20th-century Czech people
20th-century British people
Czech orientalists
British orientalists
Czech sinologists
Academics of the University of Cambridge
British people of Czech descent
People from Brtnice
Czechoslovak emigrants to the United Kingdom